Khabezsky District is an administrative and a municipal district (raion), one of the ten in the Karachay-Cherkess Republic, Russia. It is located in the north of the republic. Its administrative center is the rural locality (an aul) of Khabez. As of the 2010 Census, the total population of the district was 30,356, with the population of Khabez accounting for 20.6% of that number.

Administrative and municipal status
Within the framework of administrative divisions, Khabezsky District is one of the ten in the Karachay-Cherkess Republic and has administrative jurisdiction over all of its thirteen rural localities. As a municipal division, the district is incorporated as Khabezsky Municipal District. Its thirteen rural localities are incorporated into ten rural settlements within the municipal district. The aul of Khabez serves as the administrative center of both the administrative and municipal district.

References

Notes

Sources

Districts of Karachay-Cherkessia